Brachycythara multicincta is a species of sea snail, a marine gastropod mollusk in the family Mangeliidae.

Description
The length of the shell attains 2.9 mm.

Distribution
B. multicincta can be found in the Gulf of Mexico and in the Caribbean Sea off the coast of Cuba.

References

 Rolán E. & Espinosa J. (1999). El complejo Brachycythara biconica (C. B. Adams, 1850) (Mollusca: Gastropoda: Turridae) en Cuba, con la descripción de una nueva especie. Bollettino Malacologico, 34(1–4): 43–49

External links
 G., F. Moretzsohn, and E. F. García. 2009. Gastropoda (Mollusca) of the Gulf of Mexico, pp. 579–699 in Felder, D.L. and D.K. Camp (eds.), Gulf of Mexico–Origins, Waters, and Biota. Biodiversity. Texas A&M Press, College Station, Texas
  Tucker, J.K. 2004 Catalog of recent and fossil turrids (Mollusca: Gastropoda). Zootaxa 682:1–1295.
 MNHN, Paris: Brachycythara multicincta

multicincta